Tresignana is a comune (municipality) in the Province of Ferrara in the Italian region Emilia-Romagna. It was established on 1 January 2019 with the merger of the municipalities of Formignana and Tresigallo.

References

Cities and towns in Emilia-Romagna